Bernado Carl Botha (born 4 July 1988) is a South African professional rugby union player who last played for the  in the Currie Cup. He has been playing first class rugby since 2009 and was a regular member of the South Africa Sevens team between 2010 and 2013. His regular position is winger or fullback.

Career

Youth and Varsity rugby

Botha represented South Western Districts at the 2004 Under-16 Grant Khomo Week. He then moved to Gauteng and was included in the  squad for the 2006 Under-18 Craven Week tournament. The following year, he received a call-up to the South African Under-19 squad for the 2007 Under 19 Rugby World Championship in Ireland.

Senior career

He made seven starts in total and weighed in with four tries during that tournament.

Following two more appearances in the 2010 Vodacom Cup, Botha was then included in the  squad for the 2010 Super 14 season.

Sevens rugby

In 2010, Botha joined the South African Sevens squad and appeared in the Dubai and South African legs of the 2010–11 IRB Sevens World Series. In October 2011, he signed a two-year deal with the South African Rugby Union to represent the sevens side and became a regular for them in the 2011–12 and 2012–13 seasons of the IRB Sevens World Series.

Griffons

At the conclusion of the 2012–13 IRB Sevens World Series, Botha made a return to fifteens rugby and made five appearances for Welkom-based side  during the 2013 Currie Cup First Division.

Pumas

He then joined the  prior to the 2014 Vodacom Cup competition. He was a member of the Pumas side that won the Vodacom Cup for the first time in 2015, beating  24–7 in the final. Botha made eight appearances during the season.

Batumi

He joined Georgian Didi 10 side Batumi for the 2017–18 season.

References

South African rugby union players
Living people
1988 births
People from Oudtshoorn
Golden Lions players
Griffons (rugby union) players
Lions (United Rugby Championship) players
Pumas (Currie Cup) players
South Africa international rugby sevens players
Rugby sevens players at the 2010 Commonwealth Games
Commonwealth Games bronze medallists for South Africa
Commonwealth Games rugby sevens players of South Africa
Commonwealth Games medallists in rugby sevens
World Games gold medalists
Competitors at the 2013 World Games
Medallists at the 2010 Commonwealth Games